Bangabhumi (meaning the land of Vanga, also spelt Bongobhumi) also known as Bir Bongo, is a separatist movement to create a Bengali Hindu country for Bangladeshi Hindus in southwestern Bangladesh, envisioned by Banga Sena. Banga Sena is a separatist Hindu organization which advocates formation of a Bangabhumi for Bengali Hindus in Bangladesh. The group is led by Kalidas Baidya.

The movement was founded in 1973 in India soon after the independence of Bangladesh to support the Hindu refugees from Bangladesh, who were targeted by the Pakistan Army in the 1971 Bangladesh atrocities. However, this movement did not receive much support at that time. In an interview with BBC News in 2001, Chittaranjan Sutar, one of the alleged organisers of the movement, denied supporting the creation of a new nation.

Banga Sena

Major General Jahangir Alam Chowdhury, the Director General of the Bangladesh Rifles (BDR), in a talk with the Director General of the Border Security Force (BSF) Ajay Raj Sharma in 2004 said that the extremist group Banga Sena was carrying out terrorist and secessionist activities against Bangladesh from its bases in the Indian state of West Bengal.  Khodeza Begum in an article in the Global Politician accused India of helping to organize the Banga Sena.

In March 2006, a senior official of the home ministry of Bangladesh expressed concern over the anti-Bangladesh activities by the Banga Sena. Regarding this he added that Bangladesh wants a peaceful border with neighboring India and the situation has vastly improved following coordinated border patrolling by both countries. A Bangladeshi official stated that the organization is a "threat to the sovereignty of Bangladesh".

More than 400 members of the Banga Sena were arrested in India on 18 February 2003, for trying to cross over into Bangladesh from the district of North 24 Parganas in southern West Bengal. According to police sources, activists belonging to the organization began gathering at the Indo-Bangladesh border at Halencha, North 24 Parganas in the jurisdiction of the Bagda police station since morning that day.

In January 2004, the director general of the Bangladesh Rifles gave a list of the camps of the remaining Shanti Bahni elements in the North-East Indian states of Tripura and Assam and in adjoining Indian provinces to the director general of the Border Security Force. The list documented that the Banga Sena, along with several other groups, carried out communal tension and separatist activities against Bangladesh from West Bengal. Indian Foreign Secretary said that India will cooperate in tackling the Banga Sena and other insurgent groups. In September 2007, the representatives of two NGOs, Diphu Citizen Peace Forum and Karbi Human Rights Watch, in the Karbi Anglong District of Assam said that the Banga Sena was involved in extortion and it could pose a threat to the peace in the region.

Regarding the activities of the Banga Sena, the Foreign Secretary of Bangladesh Shamsher Mobin Chowdhury made it clear that his country will not tolerate any statement or move against its territory or sovereignty. The All India Minority Forum, an organization for religious minorities in India, also expressed concern over this organization.

See also
 Bengali Hindus
 Hinduism in Bangladesh
 List of Hindu nationalist political parties
 Bangladesh–India relations
 Hindu Mahasabha

References

Hinduism in Bangladesh
Hinduism-related controversies
Politics of Bangladesh
Hindu organisations based in Bangladesh
Hindu political parties in Bangladesh
Secessionist organizations in Asia
Militant Hindu groups
Hindutva
Bangladesh–India relations
Separatism in Bangladesh